= Uumaa =

Settlement in Övertorneå Municipality, Sweden

Coordinates: 66°35′N 23°18′E

Uumaa is a village in the county of Norrbotten in Sweden.
